Evrenos or Evrenuz (died 17 November 1417 in Yenice-i Vardar) was an Ottoman military commander. Byzantine sources mention him as Ἐβρενός, Ἀβρανέζης, Βρανέζης, Βρανεύς (?), Βρενέζ, Βρενέζης, Βρενές.

He served as a general under Süleyman Pasha, Murad I, Bayezid I, Süleyman Çelebi and Mehmed I. Legends stating that he lived for 129 years and had an incredibly long career are thought to be inaccurate. These sources of confusion may be linked to the deeds of his descendants becoming intertwined with his own achievements in historical retellings. He was also known as Gavrinos, and believed to descend from a Greek family.

Biography 
Οriginally, Gazi Evrenos was a noble dignitary, a bey in the principality of Karasi, joining the Ottomans only after their conquest of the beylik in 1345. A Greek legend maintains that Evrenos' father was a certain Ornos, renegade Byzantine governor of Bursa (Prusa) who defected to the Ottomans, and then on to Karasi, after the Siege of Bursa, in 1326. Stanford J. Shaw states that Evrenos was originally a Byzantine Greek feudal prince in Anatolia who had entered Ottoman service following the capture of Bursa, converted to Islam, and later became a leading military commander under both Orhan and Murat. Joseph von Hammer regarded Evrenos as simply a Byzantine Greek convert to Islam. Peter Sugar considers the family to be of Greek origin as well. Turkish sources report that the family was of Turkish origin. However, others dismiss this, noting that the Evrenos family were certainly of non-Turkish origin.

Evrenos has led many crucial Ottoman campaigns and battles in Bulgaria, Thessaly, and Serbia. After having participated in the Ottoman conquest of Adrianopolis in 1362, Evrenos was appointed to uc beği (frontier warlord) of Thessaly. Evrenos built a hospice in Komotini following his conquest of the area in 1363. Later, Evrenos also led the conquest of Serres.

The most famous battle which of Evrenos participated in the shattering victory of the battle of Maritsa, where the 800 Ottoman warriors launched a devastating night raid where they defeated 70,000 Serbian Empire soldiers. Later, Evrenos and his Akinjis fought in the Battle of Kosovo (1389) and the Battle of Nicopolis (1396). Evrenos conquered Keşan, İpsala, Komotini, Feres, Xanthi, Maroneia, Monastir, and, in 1397, Corinth. He founded the town Yenice-i Vardar, modern Giannitsa.

Gazi Evrenos died at an advanced age in Yenice-i Vardar. He was buried in a mausoleum there in 1417. The mausoleum survives but was badly mutilated in 19th century and served for a time as an agricultural store. Among the numerous descendants of Evrenos, apparently the memory of some has dived into oblivion, as their deeds got incorporated into the achievements of their illustrious forefather. This explains the legendary, yet unlikely, 129-year lifespan of Evrenos.

Legacy 

As one of the most successful Ottoman commanders, Evrenos acquired a considerable amount of wealth and founded numerous endowments (awqaf). Several monuments attributed to him survive in southeastern Europe. Of primary importance is his mausoleum, or türbe, with its accompanying epitaph in Giannitsa. A hammam of Evrenos stands to the south of the mausoleum. Two other monuments stand in Greek Thrace.

The inhabitants of Gianitsa (Ottoman: Yenice Vardar) down to the early 20th century displayed reverence for "Gazi Baba", that is "papa Gazi".

Heritage & descendants 

Some argue that the name Evrenos (also Evrenuz) is not Turkish. Heath Lowry theorized that the father of Hayreddin Barbarossa perhaps was a Sipahi cavalry served under Evrenos. What is certain is that Gazi Evrenos was from Ottoman Anatolia and first appears as bey. Lapavitsas even put forward that the founder, Piranki (Prangı) Isa Bey, might've been descended from the mercenaries of the Catalan Company, who razed the coasts of Asia Minor in the early 14th century. But modern historians generally reject these views. In light of a newly discovered vâkfiye (pious endowment charter) drawn up in 1456-1457 by İsa Beğ (one of Evrenos' seven sons), it posits a new explanation for the ethnic origins of the family. In this regard it advances the hypothesis that to his contemporaries 'Evrenos' was actually known as 'Evreniz/Evrenüz' or 'Avraniz/Avranüz.' Further, according to Heath W. Lowry, that his father's actual name was Branko/Pranko Lazart, which, according to Lowry, raises the possibility of a Serbian origin for the family. Others, such as Stanford J. Shaw, Dimitri Kitsikis, Peter Sugar, Joseph Von Hammer propose a Greek origin for the family, with Shaw noting that he was a Byzantine feudal prince in Anatolia who converted to Islam and entered Ottoman service following the capture of Bursa.

Îsâ "Prangi" Bey, Evrenos' father, was, according to some sources, the son of Bozoklu Han, who joined Süleyman Pasha in his conquest of Rumelia.

Gazi Evrenos Bey was father of seven sons (Khidr-shah, Isa, Suleyman, Ali, Yakub, Barak, Begdje) and several daughters.

Together with the Mihaloğulları (from the Beylik of Karasi ), Malkoçoğulları (from Serbia), Ömerli/Ömeroğlu, and the Turahanoğulları, Evrenos' descendants, the Evrenosoğulları, constitute one of the Byzantine families that effectively formed the early Ottoman warrior nobility.

References

External links
 Mausoleum of Gazi Evrenos in Giannitsa (Yenitsa), Greece.

See also
 Lala Shahin Pasha
 Çandarlı Kara Halil Hayreddin Pasha
 Umur the Lion

14th-century births
1417 deaths
Military personnel of the Ottoman Empire
People from the Ottoman Empire of Greek descent
Macedonia under the Ottoman Empire
14th-century people from the Ottoman Empire
15th-century people from the Ottoman Empire
Greek Muslims
City founders
Ottoman people of the Byzantine–Ottoman wars
People of the Ottoman Interregnum
Converts to Islam from Eastern Orthodoxy